The Nest (2002), also known as Nid de guêpes, is a French action/thriller movie, co-written and directed by Florent Emilio Siri. The literal translation of the French title is Wasp's Nest. The film is quasi-remake of the 1976 film, Assault on Precinct 13, which in turn was inspired by 1959's Rio Bravo.

Plot 
During Bastille Day when most people are enjoying the French national holiday, a group of thieves prepare to commit a warehouse robbery at a massive industrial park. Meanwhile, Laborie, a special agent in the French special forces, is leading an international team that is escorting the captured leader of the Albanian mafia, Abedin Nexhep, who is due in court on charges of running an extensive European prostitution network. Despite the considerable security escort, Nexhep's henchmen still manage to set up an ambush.

Laborie manages to escape with Nexhep. They take refuge in the warehouse that is being robbed of computer equipment by the group of criminals. While facing off against the would-be thieves, the Albanian mafia surround the warehouse. Soon the three groups are involved in a long firefight with everyone involved struggling to survive.

Cast
Samy Naceri as Nasser
Benoît Magimel as Santino
Nadia Farès as Laborie
Pascal Greggory as Louis
Sami Bouajila as Selim
Anisia Uzeyman as Nadia
Richard Sammel as Winfried
Valerio Mastandrea as Giovanni
Martial Odone as Martial
Martin Amic as Spitz
Alexandre Hamidi as Tony
Angelo Infanti as Abedin Nexhep

Production 
Nid de Guêpes combines a director's love of the Western, especially the old films such as the original Fort Apache, with modern European fears about transnational crime and the modern cinematic trope of the girl hero or female action hero.

The cinematography of the movie was highly influential in subsequent American cinema releases, especially the most recent remake of Assault on Precinct 13.  The film closely follows John Carpenter's original Assault on Precinct 13 even down to a similar last stand and a variant of the infamous "ice cream truck" scene.

References

External links

2002 films
2002 action thriller films
French action thriller films
2000s French-language films
Films about organized crime in France
French remakes of American films
2000s French films